Michael Leo Kehoe (born January 17, 1962) is an American politician. A Republican, he serves as the 48th lieutenant governor of Missouri, having been in office since June 18, 2018. Kehoe previously served in the Missouri Senate, representing the state's 6th senatorial district. On June 18, 2018, Governor Mike Parson appointed Kehoe as Missouri's lieutenant governor. Both Parson and Kehoe were elected to a full term in 2020.

During his time in the Missouri Senate, Kehoe served as the Majority Leader from 2015 to 2018.

Early life
Kehoe was born and raised in the St. Louis area by his single-parent mother. He was the youngest of six children. His father left the family when he was only one year old. He attended Chaminade College Preparatory School.

Missouri Senate
Kehoe was appointed by Governor Matt Blunt to the Missouri Highway and Transportation Commission in 2005. Without having held elected office before, Kehoe ran for the 6th District State Senate seat to succeed Carl Vogel. In a close Republican primary, he defeated three other candidates to advance to the 2010 general election, where he ran unopposed.

During the 96th General Assembly, Senator Kehoe served on the following committees:
 Vice-Chairman, Transportation Committee
 Member, Education Committee
 Member, Commerce Committee
 Member, Consumer Protection Committee
 Member, Energy & the Environment Committee

Lieutenant Governor of Missouri

On June 18, 2018, Governor Mike Parson appointed Kehoe as lieutenant governor. The appointment came with legal uncertainty, as a state law ( the Constitution of Missouri) states that the governor can fill all vacancies "other than in the offices of lieutenant governor, state senator or representative, sheriff, or recorder of deeds in the city of St. Louis". The Constitution of Missouri states "The governor shall fill all vacancies in public offices unless otherwise provided by law, and his appointees shall serve until their successors are duly elected or appointed and qualified." Parson stated that he believed that the Constitution gave him authority to tap Kehoe as lieutenant governor.

The Democrats lost their lawsuit in the Cole County Circuit Court due to a lack of standing and the vagueness of the state law which states it cannot be done, but does not provide a process to fill the position. That lawsuit was on appeal in the Missouri Supreme Court, Appeal No. SC97284, with oral argument held on November 7, 2018. On April 16, 2019, the Missouri Supreme Court upheld the appointment of Kehoe to lieutenant governor by a vote of 5–2. The decision written by Chief Justice Zel Fischer stated that "Governor Parson was within his constitutional authority when he appointed Kehoe to the office of Lieutenant Governor,".

Kehoe was elected lieutenant governor in his own right in 2020.

In March 2021, Kehoe announced his intention to run for governor in 2024.

Personal life
At age 25, Kehoe began working for Osage Industries, a company involved with auto parts and the manufacturing of ambulances. After selling Osage Industries in 1992, he purchased an auto dealership in Jefferson City, Missouri, but sold it shortly after entering politics. Kehoe and his wife Claudia are the parents of four children. He is the second Roman Catholic to hold the office of Lieutenant Governor of Missouri, the first being Thomas Eagleton.

Electoral history

State Senator

Lieutenant Governor

References

External links

|-

|-

1962 births
21st-century American politicians
Catholics from Missouri
Chaminade College Preparatory School (Missouri) alumni
Lieutenant Governors of Missouri
Living people
Politicians from St. Louis
Republican Party Missouri state senators
Candidates in the 2024 United States elections